Roelof Cornelis (Roel) Robbertsen (born 6 October 1948 in Renswoude) is a Dutch politician and pig farmer. He is a member of the Christian Democratic Appeal (Christen-Democratisch Appèl). From 1 June 2007 until 7 June 2013 he was Queen's Commissioner of the province of Utrecht.

Robbersen was a member of the municipal council of Renswoude from 1978 to 1990 and also an alderman of this Utrecht municipality from 1979 to 1990. From 1991 to 2002 he was a member of the States-Provincial and from 1995 to 2002 a member of the States Deputed of the province of Utrecht. From 2002 to 2007 he was mayor of Ede.

Roel Robbertsen is married and a member of the Protestant Church in the Netherlands (PKN).

References 
  Parlement.com biography

External links 
  Queen's Commissioner Roel Robbersen, Province of Utrecht website

1948 births
Living people
Aldermen in Utrecht (province)
Christian Democratic Appeal politicians
Dutch bloggers
Dutch farmers
King's and Queen's Commissioners of Utrecht
Mayors in Gelderland
People from Ede, Netherlands
Members of the Provincial Council of Utrecht
Members of the Provincial-Executive of Utrecht
Municipal councillors in Utrecht (province)
People from Renswoude
Protestant Church Christians from the Netherlands